Surabhi Santosh is an Indian Actress, model and classical dancer and lawyer who has appeared primarily in Kannada and Malayalam films. She made her debut in films with director S Narayan’s Dushtaa (2011).

Personal life 
Born in Trivandrum to Malayali parents Sindhu and Santosh Kumar, who is a former Colonel in the Indian Army, she did her schooling in various schools around the country. She is a B.A., LL.B(law) graduate, Bharatanatyam dancer and plays the veena. She currently resides in Bengaluru.  Even though Surabhi shares a similar name with 2 other active south-Indian actress Surbhi and Surabhi Lakshmi, she wanted to keep her birth name as a tribute to her parents.

Career
Surabhi made her acting debut in veteran filmmaker S. Narayan's action drama film, Dushtaa (2011) opposite Pankaj. She then appeared in Jataayu, another Kannada film in 2013. During the release of the film, another co-star Roopashri was critical of the team for featuring Surabhi heavily in the promotions ahead of her.

In 2017, her long delayed Tamil film, Aayirathil Iruvar (2017) by Saran was released after being in production for three years. Featuring her opposite Vinay, the actress was named  Swasthika by the director, for this film.

After a short break of three years taken to complete her graduate degree, she returned to acting with the Kannada film, 2nd Half. When the film hit theatres, her role in it was widely appreciated by critics and audience alike. The New Indian Express, in its review, wrote "Surabhi Santhosh is the soul of the film with the revolving mostly around her. Even though she doesn't have much screen space, 2nd Half doesn't make for a complete picture without her". Sandalwood Cinema mentioned "Surabhi Santhosh is also a terrific performer you cannot miss" while CiniBuzz appreciated her choice of comeback film, stating that, "Surabhi in her come back to Kannada cinema after four years has picked a good role. She is a treat to watch on screen".

Surabhi has marked her debut in Malayalam with the 2018 film Kuttanadan Marpappa in which Kunchacko Boban plays the lead. Her next release in Malayalam, director Sugeeth's fantasy-horror film Kinavalli was well received and opened to positive reviews. Her character in the film was appreciated with Deccan Chronicle and The Times of India stating that she, along with the other actors in the film, "delivered a commendable performance" and "performed well" respectively, while K.R. Rajeesh from Nowrunning.com wrote "Surabhi is the pick of the debutants and her notable performance keeps the grace intact while considering the fantasy theme."

Her first release in 2019 was the Malayalam film An International Local Story directed by the established actor/comedian Harisree Ashokan. She was later seen in My Great Grandfather with actor Jayaram. She essayed a cameo role in Margamkali directed by Sreejith Vijayan with whom she had earlier worked in Kuttanadan Marpappa and in Kalidas Jayaram-starrer Happy Sardar.

Filmography

Other Works

Awards and nominations

References

Living people
Indian film actresses
Actresses in Kannada cinema
Actresses in Tamil cinema
21st-century Indian actresses
Actresses in Malayalam cinema
Year of birth missing (living people)